Whiston railway station serves the village of Whiston in Merseyside, England. The station, and all trains serving it, are operated by Northern Trains. It was opened on 10 September 1990 by British Rail, at a cost of £420,000.

Facilities
The station is staffed throughout the day, from 06:00 to 23:55 Mondays through to Saturdays and 08:40 to midnight on Sundays.  The ticket office is on the Liverpool-bound platform.  There are also waiting shelters, help points, timetable poster boards and digital information screens on each platform.  Both platforms have step-free access, as has the connecting bridge between them.

Services
Whiston is served by Northern Trains services between Liverpool Lime Street and either  via  or Warrington Bank Quay every half-hour on Monday to Saturday daytimes.  In the evenings there is an hourly service to  via the Airport & to Liverpool.  Local trains to Manchester Victoria now only run at peak periods and early mornings/late evenings.  There is also a single evening peak train to  that uses the Parkside curve east of Newton-le-Willows to access the West Coast Main Line.

On Sundays, trains run once per hour between Liverpool Lime Street and Wilmslow via Manchester Airport.

Following completion of electrification of the line in Spring 2015, the Liverpool to Manchester Airport, Liverpool to Manchester Victoria and Liverpool to Warrington Bank Quay services are now operated by 4-Car Class 319 and 3-car Class 323 Electric Multiple Units.

Gallery

References

External links

Railway stations in the Metropolitan Borough of Knowsley
DfT Category E stations
Railway stations opened by British Rail
Railway stations in Great Britain opened in 1990
Northern franchise railway stations